The Fasofoot D1 is the top division of the Burkinabé Football Federation. It was created in 1961.

Burkinabé Premier League clubs – 2021-22
AS Koupéla (Koupéla)
AS Douanes (Ouagadougou)
ASEC Koudougou (Koudougou)
ASFA Yennenga (Ouagadougou)
ASF Bobo (Bobo-Dioulasso)
AS SONABEL (Ouagadougou)
Étoile Filante (Ouagadougou)
Kiko FC (Bobo-Dioulasso)
Majestic (Pô)
RC Bobo (Bobo-Dioulasso)
RC Kadiogo (Kadiogo)
Royal FC (Bobo-Dioulasso)
Salitas FC (Ouagadougou)
Vitesse FC (Bobo-Dioulasso)
US Forces Armées (Ouagadougou)

Previous winners
Previous winners are:

1960-61: ASF Bobo
1962: Étoile Filante
1963: USFR Abidjan-Niger
1963-64: USFR Abidjan-Niger
1965: Étoile Filante
1966: ASF Bobo
1967: US Ouagadougou
1968: USFR Abidjan-Niger
1969: ASFAN
1970: ASFAN
1971: ASFAN
1972: RC Bobo
1973: Jeanne d'Arc
1974: Silures
1975: Silures
1976: Silures
1977: Silures
1978: Silures
1979: Silures
1980: Silures
1981–82 : No competition
1983: US Ouagadougou
1984: ASFAN
1985: Étoile Filante
1986: Étoile Filante
1987: USFAN
1988: Étoile Filante
1988–89: ASFA Yennenga
1989-90: Étoile Filante
1990-91: Étoile Filante
1991-92: Étoile Filante
1992-93: Étoile Filante
1994: Étoile Filante
1995: ASFA Yennenga
1996: RC Bobo
1997: RC Bobo
1997-98: USFAN
1998-99: ASFA Yennenga
2000: US Forces Armées
2001: Étoile Filante
2002: ASFA Yennenga
2002-03: ASFA Yennenga
2003-04: ASFA Yennenga
2004-05: RC Kadiogo
2005-06: ASFA Yennenga
2007: Commune (Ouagadougou)
2007-08: Étoile Filante
2008-09: ASFA Yennenga
2009-10: ASFA Yennenga
2010-11: ASFA Yennenga
2011-12: ASFA Yennenga
2013 :ASFA Yennenga
2013-14: Étoile Filante
2014-15: RC Bobo
2015-16: RC Kadiogo
2016-17: RC Kadiogo
2017–18: ASF Bobo
2018–19: Rahimo FC
2019–20: Cancelled
2020–21: AS SONABEL
2021–22: RC Kadiogo

Performance by club

Top scorers

References

External links
League at fifa.com
Burkinabé Premier League summary(SOCCERWAY)

 
Football leagues in Burkina Faso
Top level football leagues in Africa